The  Cardinal del Portogallo Altarpiece is a painting of  in tempera and oil on panel by Antonio and Piero del Pollaiuolo. It shows Saints Vincent, James the Great and Eustace.

References

External links
 

1467 paintings
Altarpieces
Paintings in the collection of the Uffizi
Paintings by Antonio del Pollaiuolo
Paintings by Piero del Pollaiuolo
Paintings of Saint Eustace
Paintings of James the Great
Paintings of Vincent of Saragossa